The 1907 Central Michigan Normalites football team represented Central Michigan Normal School, later renamed Central Michigan University, as an independent during the 1907 college football season. Football was reinstated after one year's absence, and Ralph Thacker, who had played fullback for Olivet College the prior year, was named coach of the football team. Bruce Stickles was selected as the team captain. Although the Central Michigan football media guide reports that the 1907 football team compiled a 2–4 record, including a loss to Alma College, the contemporaneous newspaper report on the Alma game reports it as a victory for Central by a 13 to 0 score. Accordingly, it appears that the correct record of the 1907 football team was 3–3.

Schedule

References

Central Michigan
Central Michigan Chippewas football seasons
Central Michigan Normalites football